Carbon Lehigh Intermediate Unit #21 (CLIU), located in Schnecksville, Pennsylvania, is one of twenty nine Intermediate Unit Educational Service Agencies created by an Act of the General Assembly of Pennsylvania in 1971. CLIU provides services to 14 public school districts, non-public schools in its service region, and two vocational-technical schools (located in Carbon County and Lehigh County). 

The agency has no taxing power. Its revenues come from federal grants, state grants, private grants, annual payments from each public school district in its region and charges to individuals for some services like driver's education. The agency provides many services including specialized special education services and training for teachers to meet their state mandated continuing professional education with some offered online. CLIU21 also operates a Librarians' Consortium for librarians from public libraries, private libraries, school libraries and higher education librarians.

The CLIU serves as a coordinating agency for the purpose of bringing together several school districts, vocational schools, businesses, higher education and community groups. The agency is governed by a board made up of one member from each participating public school districts. The members are appointed from the sending school board's elected members. Each local school board reviews and must approve the intermediate unit's annual budget in the spring of each school year.

Dr. Elaine E. Eib is the Executive Director (contract April 17, 2014 - April 17, 2018, salary $149,972 in 2014). Kimberly A. Talipan serves as the Assistant to the Executive Director (salary $140,349 in 2015). Employees of all Pennsylvania Intermediate units are members of the PSERS state teacher pension system. The teacher and administrator retirement benefits are equal to at least 2.00% x Final Average Salary x Total Credited Service. (Some teachers benefits utilize a 2.50% benefit factor.) After 40 years of service, Pennsylvania public school teachers and administrators can retire with 100% of the average salary of their final 3 years of employment.

The agency serves the following school districts:
Allentown School District
Catasauqua Area School District
East Penn School District
Jim Thorpe Area School District
Lehighton Area School District
Northern Lehigh School District
Northwestern Lehigh School District
Palmerton Area School District
Panther Valley School District
Parkland School District
Salisbury Township School District
Southern Lehigh School District
Weatherly Area School District
Whitehall-Coplay School District

It also services the following schools:

Al Ahad Islamic School
Allentown Central Catholic High School
Arts Academy Charter School
Blue Mountain Christian Day School
CAI Learning Academy Computer Aid Inc. Learning Academy (K-3)
Cambridge Day School
Carbon Career and Technical Institute
Children First Community Academy
Circle of Seasons Charter School
Devine School
Emmaus Baptist Academy
Goddard School
Innovative Arts Academy Charter School
Jewish Day School of the Lehigh Valley
Lehigh Career and Technical Institute
Lehigh Childrens Academy
Lincoln Leadership Academy Charter School
Manarah Islamic Academy
Medical Academy Charter School
Packer Ridge Academy
Resurrected Life Childrens Academy
Roberto Clemente Charter School
Sacred Heart of Jesus School
Salem Christian School
Seven Generations Charter School
St Ann School
St Elizabeth Regional School
St John Neumann Regional School
St John Vianney Regional School
St Joseph Regional Academy
St. Michael the Archangel School
Swain School

CLIU Business Office
The CLIU Business Office is the fiscal agent for all revenue and expenditures made by the CLIU. The Business Office oversees approximately 50 different budgets totaling in excess of $80 million. In addition, the Business Office is also responsible for all the external reporting to the Commonwealth of Pennsylvania and also the Federal government for the various programs and budgets of the CLIU.

References

External links
 CLIU official website 
 Pennsylvania Intermediate Unit website

Education in Carbon County, Pennsylvania
Education in Lehigh County, Pennsylvania
Intermediate Units in Pennsylvania